Follen is a surname. Notable people with the surname include:

Charles Follen Adams (1842–1918), American poet
August Ludwig Follen (1794–1855), German poet
Charles Follen (1796–1840), German poet and patriot, became the first professor of German at Harvard University, a Unitarian minister, and a radical abolitionist
Eliza Lee Cabot Follen (1787–1860), author and abolitionist
Paul Follen (1799–1844), German-American attorney and farmer, who had founded the Gießener Auswanderungsgesellschaft
Charles Follen McKim (1847–1909), American Beaux-Arts architect of the late 19th century

See also
Follen Street Historic District, historic district in Cambridge, Massachusetts, just northwest of the Cambridge Common
Building at 10 Follen Street, historic house at 10 Follen Street in Cambridge, Massachusetts
Follen Church Society-Unitarian Universalist, historic Unitarian Universalist congregation at 755 Massachusetts Avenue in Lexington, Massachusetts